Saleen Automotive, Inc., commonly known as Saleen (/səˈliːn/), is an American manufacturer of specialty high-performance sports cars and high-performance automotive parts. Saleen is headquartered in Corona, California, US. On June 26, 2013 Saleen became public through a reverse merger. It is listed on the OTC Bulletin Board and is controlled and majority owned by Saleen brand founder Steve Saleen.

Saleen's flagship car was the Saleen S7, introduced in 2000. The S7 was wholly built by Saleen and features a mid-engine design in a high-performance sports car package. It is also currently the only Saleen production car not based on an existing design or chassis.

Saleen currently manufactures the S302 (Mustang-based), the Ford F-150-based Saleen Sportruck, and Sportruck XR, a Saleen Tesla GTX and Saleen S1, a new Saleen sports car, a limited run successor to the S7 sports car, the S7 LM.

In 2017, Saleen formed a partnership with the city of Rugao to form  Jiangsu Saleen Automotive Technology. to produce and distribute Saleen vehicles in China for the Chinese market. The company's only mass-produced model, the Maimai, had a maximum speed of 100 kilometers per hour and a new European driving cycle range of 305 km, was introduced in 2019, but only 27 had sold as of April 2021. In May 2020, the former legal manager at Saleen, Qiao Yudong, revealed that the chairman of the company, Wang Xiaolin, had made false claims about technology investment and embezzled a significant amount of state capital by inflating the costs of so called "car-making technologies". Wang then absconded to the United States.  As a result, the local Court closed down two local factories of Saleen Auto, froze the equity of four companies held by Wang, and shuttered Saleen Auto's Shanghai branch.

History

1980s

The Saleen brand was established in 1983 originally as "Saleen Autosport" by Steve Saleen, a former professional Formula Atlantic race car driver. The first Saleens were produced in 1984 when they built three cars as the first production run – a white hatchback, a copper glow hatchback, and a black hatchback.

In 1985, Steve Saleen put the first certified supercharger on a production Saleen Mustang. This car was delivered to Nault Ford in Manchester, New Hampshire, and was the first use of a centrifugal supercharger on a late model Mustang.

In 1986, the Saleen made its entry into the Sport Car Club of America race series with a race prepped version of the Saleen Mustang. A notable win that year at the 24 Hours of Mosport was the catalyst for Saleen vehicles becoming heavily involved in motorsport throughout the rest of the 1980s.

1990s

By 1990, in response to increased aftermarket parts demand, Saleen established Saleen Performance Parts as an independent operation.

In 1994, Saleen debuted the S351 which had a Saleen-built 351 ci engine. Despite the Mustang GT changing to the modular V8 in 1996, Saleen continued with development of their own EPA-certified 351W engine.

In 1995, Steve Saleen teamed up with comedian Tim Allen and formed the Saleen-Allen "RRR" Speedlab race team.

In 1997, Saleen introduced a Saleen Contour concept and an SUV, the Saleen XP8 Explorer.

In the late 1990s, the company was restructured and became "Saleen, Inc."

2000s
In 2000, Saleen introduced their flagship vehicle, the Saleen S7 sports car. The S7 is a mid-engine, high-performance sports car that was initially priced at just under US$400,000. The S7 won four different GT championships in 2001 and has broken records at the prestigious 24-Hour Le Mans race. The S7 was Saleen's only production car not based on an existing design or chassis.

In 2001, Saleen moved its production facilities to a new 100,000 square foot facility in Irvine, California.

In 2002, Saleen was awarded the assembly and paint contract for the new Ford sports car, the Ford GT. This effectively made Saleen a tier 1 supplier to the Ford Motor Company.

In 2003, Saleen set up a special manufacturing and licensing agreement for distribution of Saleen vehicles in Canada.

In 2004, Saleen expanded its operations and manufacturing to an additional 203,000 square foot facility in Troy, Michigan. The new $15 million production facility included a high-tech paint facility and assembly line where Saleen produced the Ford GT under contract from Ford Motor Company.

In 2005, global distribution was expanded to include Japan under a new partnership with a Tokyo-based importer.

In 2006, Saleen opened its first own branded retail store in an outdoor shopping center, in Irvine, California. The showroom was described as a unique shopping experience for Saleen vehicles, parts, and apparel.

In 2007, Saleen began working with Chrysler and supplied all the paint work for the new Dodge Viper.

2010s
In 2010, 2011 Saleen Mustangs were made in Detroit by Revstone, the company that purchased and legally produced 42 Saleens those years. Steve Saleen was selling Mustangs under the SMS name as he did not legally own the name Saleen. At the end of 2011, there was an agreement between Ford, Revstone and Steve Saleen to let him start producing under the Saleen name again.
     
In 2013, Saleen entered into a merger that resulted in Saleen being a publicly traded company. Later that year it was announced that the Saleen operations, manufacturing, research and development, and paint facilities would be consolidated to an expansive four acre campus in Southern California.

In 2014, Saleen entered into an agreement to expand vehicle distribution to include China. In August 2014, Saleen unveiled an all-electric performance model, the Foursixteen (a tuned version of Tesla Model S).

In 2019, the Chinese joint-venture presented an updated version of the Saleen S7 (called the S7 Le Mans), at an event which featured Jason Statham and Chris Wu. In addition to their American hypercar, Jiangsu Secco Automobile Technology Corporation also promoted a few Rugao-built vehicles, including their electric microcar called the "MaiMai" and a crossover called the "MAC".

Jiangsu Saleen Automotive Technology
In 2017, along with partner Charles Wang, Saleen formed a partnership with the city of Rugao to form a company named "Jiangsu Saleen Automotive Technology" in the city of Rugao.  The company was to produce and distribute Saleen vehicles in China for the Chinese market. The company's only mass-produced model, the Maimai, had a maximum speed of 100 kilometers per hour and a new European driving cycle range of 305 km, was introduced in 2019, but only 27 had sold as of April 2021. In May 2020, the former legal manager at Saleen, Qiao Yudong, revealed that the chairman of the company, Wang Xiaolin, had made false claims about technology investment and embezzled a significant amount of state capital by inflating the costs of so called "car-making technologies". Wang then absconded to the United States.  As a result, the local Court closed down two local factories of Saleen Auto, froze the equity of four companies held by Wang, and shuttered Saleen Auto's Shanghai branch.

Products

Current models

Legacy models

Special vehicles
These are special vehicles made by Saleen, that were either non-production models, concept vehicles, or non-serialized versions.

Saleen Performance Parts

The aftermarket parts department of the company markets car parts and accessories such as custom wheels, exhaust systems, brakes, and other high-performance parts.

Superchargers
Series I – This was the first supercharger system created by Saleen. It was engineered with an Eaton Roots-type supercharger in 1998.
Series II – Launched in 2001, the Series II supercharger was a newer generation Eaton M90 roots-type.
Series III – This was a larger version of the Eaton supercharger. Going from 90 ci of displacement to 112 ci.
Series IV – The Series IV switched from a roots-type supercharger to a twin screw-type. This version had 1.6L of displacement.
Series V – This marked the first forced-induction system developed entirely in-house by Saleen and designed around Lysholm-sourced compressor screws with 2.3L of displacement.
Series VI – This was very similar to the Series V supercharger with added boost pressure producing more horsepower. This supercharger system was available in versions for the 2005-2009 Ford Mustang, the 2004-2008 Ford F-150 5.4L truck, Ford Expedition, Lincoln Mark LT, and Lincoln Navigator.
Saleen Shakercharger – A ram-air intake system for the Ford Mustang incorporating the Saleen Series VI supercharger with a functional hood scoop system borrowing its appearance from the S302PJ.  This product was the result of design collaboration among Saleen's engineering interns in 2007 and 2008.
 iPod adapter – a factory-installed option that was available across all of Saleen's products line that provides for an integrated iPod connection to the radio head unit.  Saleen also offered this option as an aftermarket-installed product through their Speedlabs division.
 2005–2009 Mustang HID headlamps – OEM, DOT approved bi-xenon headlamps offered by Saleen that fit 2005-2009 Mustangs.  As of early 2007, these were the only OEM-grade, street-legal HID headlamps available for the Ford Mustang
 Saleen Mustang Scenic Roof – Available across Saleen's Mustang-based products, this comprises a glass full-roof panel that replaces the traditional mustang coupe roof in lieu of a sunroof option.  The scenic roof was manufactured from tempered laminate glass and fully certified according to U.S. National Highway Traffic Safety Administration (NHTSA) standards.
Frost Touch Scenic Roof – This is a version of the scenic roof that contains Smart glass. This glass has the ability to change from clear to opaque by flipping a switch.
Watt's Link – Developed in 2007, Saleen designed a version of the popular Watt's link for 2005-2009 Ford Mustangs.

Colorlab Automotive Paints
During the development of the Saleen SR in year 1995, Saleen formed a strategic partnership with BASF that resulted in the development of unique paint color formulations coupled with advertising centered around Saleen products. During this time, the Saleen paint color "Mystic" was formulated which gave the color a chameleoon-like effect. Shortly after, an updated color called "Rainbow" was released as an evolved version of the "Mystic" color which gave a more chameleon-like effect by displaying more color changes.

Since this time, the Saleen paint color Liztick Red Metallic, named for Steve's wife, Liz, was developed along with twelve more colors, including two named for Steve's daughter, Molly Saleen, Mollypop Pink and Chrome Molly. Other Saleen exclusive colors include Plum Insane Metallic, Burnout Black Pearl, Tire Smoke White Pearl, Sour Apple Green Metallic, Orange County Orange Metallic, Maliblue Metallic, Speedlab Yellow, Shark Skin Metallic, and Beryllium Copper Metallic, and California Sunset Metallic.

In 2014, Saleen signed and agreement that made BASF the exclusive paint supplier for Saleen.

Motorsport

Saleen's birth year of 1984 also marked the first year that a Saleen Mustang was entered into a race, when owner, Steve Saleen, introduced the first streetcar, the Saleen Mustang, and raced it at Sears Point Raceway, California.

In 1986, Saleen entered the Sports Car Club of America (SCCA) Endurance Series with a race prepared version of the Saleen Mustang, winning the grueling 24 Hours of Mosport, Canada with a sponsorship from General Tire.

1987 brought an SCCA Drivers' Championship to Saleen. The Saleen 3-car team with drivers Steve Saleen, Parnelli Jones, and George Follmer also captured the Team, Manufacturer, and Tire Championships, with sponsorship from General Tire. Saleen entered the SCCA Endurance Series with an all-female driving team including Desire Wilson and Lisa Cacares who obtained the team's 1st victory of the season at Sears Point, California. Saleen Autosport also entered a General Tire backed, Ford Ranger-based, Saleen Sportruck in the SCCA Race Truck Challenge, where they captured two wins.

In 1988, the Saleen race team finished 1st, 2nd, and 3rd at 24 Hours of Mosport for the third consecutive win and gives Ford its first 1-2-3 finish since LeMans in the late 1960s.

1989 was a busy year for the Saleen race team. They entered the PPG Indy Car World Series with a team backed by Montgomery Ward. Saleen Mustangs and Sportrucks also continued their winning campaigns in SCCA Competition with General Tire sponsorship.

In 1990, Saleen entered the SCCA Trans-Am series with a Saleen Mustang backed by General Tire.

Adding to their wins, in 1991 Saleen won the SCCA Race Truck championship with five victories in six races which moved Saleen into a tie for the most victories in the series (49) and the Manufacturers' Championship. Owner and driver, Steve Saleen, campaigned the Trans-Am series with Saleen Mustang with sponsorship from Champion Batteries.

Saleen returned to SCCA Endurance competition in 1993 with a supercharged Saleen in the World Challenge Series.

In 1995, Saleen formed the Saleen/Allen "RRR" Speedlab with Tim Allen. The team of Steve Saleen, Tim Allen, and Bob Bondurant set new track records and won the final race of the SCCA World Challenge series. For 1996, The Saleen/Allen "RRR" Speedlab, with teammates Steve Saleen and Tim Allen won the SCCA Manufacturers’ Championship with the SR Widebody Saleen Mustang. Saleen also won at Watkins Glen International Raceway. In 1997, Saleen/Allen "RRR" Speedlab competed at 24 Hours of Le Mans for the first time, marking the Mustang's first return in over 30 years. Saleen also clinched the SCCA Manufacturers’ Championship title for the third time. 1998 brought more wins for the Saleen/Allen "RRR" Speedlab. The team won both the SCCA Manufacturers' and Drivers' Championship titles. ome 1999, an ex-LeMans Saleen SR won the Spanish FIA GT championship.

In 2000, Saleen competed in the inaugural Grand American Road Racing season, Saleen captured the Drivers' Championship and clinched the Manufacturers' and Team Championships in the season finale at Watkins Glen International Raceway. Saleen customer cars participated in the Speedvision World Challenge—earning a victory at Lime Rock Park. For the 2001 race season, the racing version of the S7, the Saleen S7R, was introduced. The S7R dominated racetracks during its inaugural season. Saleen S7R customer teams won four Drivers’ Championships in four different series (American LeMans, European LeMans, Grand Am, and Spanish GT). Teams driving the S7R achieved 19 wins out of 32 races including the 12 Hours of Sebring. The S7R grabbed 27 poles and set 27 fastest laps, at many tracks, including the prestigious 24 Hours of LeMans. 2002 brought more victories for the S7R. Customer teams continued to operate in four series (American LeMans, Grand Am, British GT, and Spanish GT) winning 18 out of 40 races, three Drivers’ Championships, and several more Team and Manufacturers' Championships.  It also won 21 poles and set 23 fastest laps.

In 2004, while Europe watched, the Saleen S7R captured the 1st place win at Imola, Italy, beating home-track favorites Ferrari, Maserati, and Lamborghini, and the debuting Maserati MC-12.

In 2006 the Saleen/Oreca Race Team drove the S7 race version and captured the fastest lap and took the victory at Circuit de Spa-Francorchamps. Saleen also began support of formula race teams in Europe. S7 racecars and spare parts were donated to the effort of trying to win on the European circuit.

Saleen racing results

1980s

1990s

2000s

2010s

OEM Development
In 2002, Saleen was awarded the partial assembly and paint contract for the 2004-2006 Ford GT.

Beginning with the 2007 model year, the Saleen-designed  supercharger kit in the F-150-based S331 was offered by Ford as a ship-through Ford-endorsed performance option on Harley Davidson Edition F150s.

At the 2007 New York International Auto Show, Chip Foose unveiled a Ford-endorsed limited edition F150, powered by the Saleen-designed powertrain used on the Saleen S331SC.

References

External links

 Official Site
 Saleen Club of America
 Saleen XP6/XP8 Owner Registry Database
 Saleen S281 SC

Vehicle manufacturing companies established in 1983
Sports car manufacturers
Car manufacturers of the United States
Automotive motorsports and performance companies
Auto tuning companies